Jhajha is a city and a notified area in Jamui district in the Indian state of Bihar. It lies in the southern part of Bihar very close to the Jharkhand border. It falls on the Howrah - Mughalsarai mainline about halfway between Madhupur Junction and Kiul Junction.

Demographics
 2011  Indian census, Jhajha city has 7,223 houses with a population of 40,646 of which 21,406 are males while 19,240 are females. The population of children with ages 0–6 is 5736 which is 14.11% of the total population of Jhajha town. In Jhajha, the female sex ratio is of 899 against state average of 918. Moreover, the child sex ratio is around 954 compared to the Bihar the state average 935. The literacy rate of Jhajha City is 79.13% higher than the state average of 61.80%. In Jhajha, male literacy is around 87.37% while the female literacy rate is 69.87%. Schedule Caste constitutes 13.65% while Schedule Tribe was 0.98% of the total population in Jhajha city. Out of the total population, 13,785 were engaged in work or business activity. Of this 9,971 were males while 3,814 were females. In the census survey, a worker is defined as a person who does business, job, service, and cultivator and labour activity. Of total 13785 working population, 76.71% were engaged in Main Work while 23.29% of total workers were engaged in Marginal Work.

Transport

Jhajha has a fantastic connection of railway to major cities of India. Jhajha railway station is endowed with beautiful sceneries due to the green mountains nearby.   Jhajha station is the southern end of eastern central railway of Indian railway situated on Delhi Howrah main line.  It also has good connection by roadways to nearby cities through SH18.  It has two bus stands from where buses and auto are available for nearby places like Gidhaur, Khuriparas, Sono, Borba, Belhar etc.  Small vehicles are available for travelling to villages near the cities. Rickshaw and auto-rickshaw is also part of transportation for small distances.

Flora and fauna
 
Nagi Dam and Nakti Dam Bird Sanctuary
Site description: The Nagi Dam (791 ha) and Nakti Dam (332 ha) are two sanctuaries so close to each other that they can be taken as one bird area. Nagi is 7 km from Jhajha in the Jamui District, and Nakti is a further 4 km from Nagi, occupying similar habitat. These notified sanctuaries are surrounded by rocky hillocks, formed by the damming of streams. Both these waterbodies are quite deep, with a clear water surface. These dams were built to supply water to local farms. There are cultivable lands adjacent to both the waterbodies.

Biodiversity 
Birds: About 1,600 bar-headed geese (Anser indicus) have been recorded from this site. According to Wetlands International (2002), 1% threshold of this species is 560; accordingly about 3% of the population is found at this IBA site. This site could also attract more than 20,000 birds, if fishing and other disturbances are curtailed during winter when most of the migrants are found in India. Beyond the cultivated areas, these waterbodies are surrounded by barren, rocky terrain. Consequently, dryland birds are also seen, such as the Indian courser Cursorius coromandelicus, chestnut-bellied sandgrouse (Pterocles exustus), yellow-wattled lapwing (Vanellus malabaricus) and Indian robin (Saxicoloides fulicata). The site falls in Biome-12, i.e. Indo-Gangetic plains, but species of Biome-11 are also sighted.

Nearest airports
Lok Nayak Jayaprakash Airport, Patna (199 km)
Gaya Airport, Gaya (174 km)
Netaji Subhas Chandra Bose International Airport, Kolkata (386 km)
Birsa Munda Airport, Ranchi (367 km)
Deoghar International Airport, Deoghar (57 km).  This airport is under construction and will start functioning by the end of 2021.
Kazi Nazrul Islam Airport, Andal, Durgapur (235 km)

Adjacent boundaries

References

External links 
 http://allaboutbihar.com/town.jsp?town=43702000

Cities and towns in Jamui district